A Statement of Demonstrated Ability is a statement granted at the discretion of a Federal Air Surgeon to a person who is disqualified from obtaining a pilot's medical certification. It is granted only if the disqualifying condition or disease is static or non-progressive, and the person has been found capable of performing airman duties without endangering public safety.

A Statement of Demonstrated Ability does not expire and only authorizes a designated aviation medical examiner to issue a medical certificate of a specified class if the examiner finds that the medical condition described on its face has not adversely changed. In granting a Statement of Demonstrated Ability, the Federal Air Surgeon may consider the person's operational experience and any medical facts that may affect the ability of the person to perform airman duties.

References

Federal Aviation Administration